The Maputaland-Pondoland-Albany Hotspot (MPA) is a biodiversity hotspot, a biogeographic region with significant levels of biodiversity, in Southern Africa. It is situated near the south-eastern coast of Africa, occupying an area between the Great Escarpment and the Indian Ocean. The area is named after Maputaland, Pondoland and Albany. It stretches from the Albany Centre of Plant Endemism in the Eastern Cape Province of South Africa, through the Pondoland Centre of Plant Endemism and  KwaZulu-Natal Province, the eastern side of Eswatini (known as Swaziland until 2018) and into southern Mozambique and Mpumalanga. The Maputaland Centre of Plant Endemism is contained in northern KwaZulu-Natal and southern Mozambique.

Geography
It forms a broad coastal strip extending from the extreme south of Mozambique and north-east of Mpumalanga to the east of Eastern Cape Province in South Africa, including the Wild Coast. It also includes eastern Swaziland and borders southern and eastern Lesotho. It consists of three regions more or less biologically close but each with its own characteristics. Maputaland (also known as Tongaland) refers to the southern part of Mozambique, Swaziland and northern KwaZulu-Natal, Pondoland includes central and southern KwaZulu-Natal, and Albany is the eastern part of Eastern Cape.

The terrain in this region is complex, providing a great diversity of landscapes with varied reliefs. It encompasses the southeast of the Great Escarpment and down to the edge of the Indian Ocean. As a result, this ecoregion includes much of the Drakensberg range, especially in the south and centre of the area. The northern part of the area consists mainly of medium and lowland plains with areas of ancient sand dunes, while the southern part has more rugged terrain with many cliffs cut by multiple streams. Inland, there are several ranges of mountain which include Sneeuberge, Winterberg, Amathole Mountains, Ngeli Range, Lebombo Mountains and Ngoye Range.

Biodiversity
The vegetation cover is mainly composed of forests, shrubland, bushveld and meadows. About 80% of the remaining forests of South Africa occur in this region, and nearly 600 species of trees are represented here, the highest diversity of any temperate forest in the world. Among the large number of plants in this ecoregion, about 1900 are endemic. The Albany region also has a great diversity of succulent plants, notably arborescent plants, differing from the leafy succulent species of the Karoo desert.

Although the hotspot was originally envisaged as referring to the wide diversity of vascular plant species, the pattern of plant endemism is matched by numerous endemic vertebrates. The degree of endemism among plants in this hotspot is 23.5% whereas the degree of endemism among vertebrates is 5.1% and near-endemism 4.9%. If the area of the hotspot was redefined as the "Greater Maputaland-Pondoland-Albany" area, an increase of 73%, to include the Great Escarpment area, the vertebrate endemism would total 146 species (19 freshwater fishes, 29 amphibians, 75 reptiles, 15 birds and 8 mammals), a figure 135% higher than the 62 vertebrate species for the MPA as presently defined.

Most of the endemic vertebrates in the ecoregion inhabit the forests and grasslands, and many have niche habitat requirements such as rocky outcrops or marshy areas within these larger biomes; the Sloggett's vlei rat and the Natal red rock hare are quite widespread in the area while the woodbush legless skink and the robust golden mole have narrower habitat requirements.

Vegetation types

List of endemic plants (incomplete)
The endemic plants found in the Maputaland-Pondoland-Albany Hotspot include:

 Albizia suluensis
 Allophylus natalensis
 Aloe thraskii
 Atalaya alata
 Atalaya natalensis
 Baphia racemosa
 Brachylaena discolor
 Deinbollia oblongifolia
 Encephalartos natalensis
 Encephalartos woodii
 Ficus bizanae
 Isoglossa woodii
 Jubaeopsis caffra
 Millettia grandis
 Raphia australis
 Stangeria eriopus
 Tephrosia pondoensis

Gallery

See also

References

Bibliography
 Pooley, E. (1993). The Complete Field Guide to Trees of Natal, Zululand and Transkei. .
 Pooley, E. (1998). A Field Guide to Wild Flowers; KwaZulu-Natal and the Eastern Region. .

External links
 Conservation International
Maputaland-Pondoland-Albany Hotspot

Afrotropical realm
Natural history of South Africa
Biota of South Africa